The Bureau of Indian Affairs building takeover refers to a protest by Native Americans at the Department of the Interior headquarters in the United States capital of Washington, D.C. from November 3 to November 9, 1972. On November 3, a group of around 500 American Indians with the American Indian Movement (AIM) took over the Interior building in Washington, D.C. It was the culmination of their cross-country journey in the Trail of Broken Treaties, intended to bring attention to American Indian issues such as living standards and treaty rights. 

A group of protesters went to the Bureau of Indian Affairs (BIA) offices at the national headquarters building, intending to negotiate for better housing on reservations and other related issues. Protesters began the siege after interpreting a government refusal of their demands as a double cross. Protesters defied a federal court order to leave the building after the first night of the occupation. The takeover quickly gained national media attention. 

Protesters overturned tables and desks against windows, fortifying against potential police attack. Some set fires in interior offices and the marble lobbies, destroying many historic documents. The demonstrators started to run out of provisions after several days. They would not allow police or any government representative to approach the building, so two children of BIA employees were recruited to bring in provisions. After a week, the protesters left, some taking documents with them, having caused an estimated $700,000 in damages. The Washington Post claimed that the destruction and theft of records could set them back 50 to 100 years.

President Richard M. Nixon had an interest in promoting tribal sovereignty, as he had ended the termination of tribes that was part of 1950s policy. Interested in the decentralization of government, Nixon fundamentally agreed that tribes should manage their operations. After the BIA takeover, he signed a law to restore one tribe to federally recognized status and supported legislation that offered tribes control over their own operations and programs.

Preparation 
 

AIM members had done research and organized to prepare for their 1972 cross-country journey and anticipated negotiating with the federal government. They researched, organized, and prepared in 1972 after the brief BIA takeover in 1971. Understanding the law was essential to bringing the claims of Indian tribes and the urban populations forward to policy makers and the courts. Volunteer attorneys and other scholars researched the laws, executive orders, and BIA budgeting and practices to inform the AIM agenda of exposing government misdirection and illegal practice. 

Indians were concerned about the lands they had lost through treaties, speculation, and corruption. They struggled to make lives on the small areas of reservations, often isolated from population centers.

Momentum and support grew for AIM among younger Native Americans and First Nations peoples. Unlike in 1971, the groups were prepared and focused on their target. Sympathetic groups joined the planning:

 National Indian Brotherhood of Canada
 Native American Rights Fund
 National Indian Youth Council
 National American Indian Council
 National Council on Indian Work
 National Indian Leadership Training
 American Indian Committee on Alcohol and Drug Abuse

Others who endorsed the effort 
 Native American Women’s Action Council
 United Native Americans
 National Indian Lutheran Board
 Coalition of Indian-Controlled School Boards
 Black Panther Party for Self Defense

Occupation 
 

Indians from around the country swept into groups and converged on the Interior building on November 2, 1972, and stayed there for seven days. Richard M. Nixon celebrated a landslide presidential victory on November 7 as AIM’s 'Twenty Points' were presented to him. It reminded Nixon how unprepared he was to deal with Indian issues across the country and how he had failed in his effort to quell Indian pressures for reforms. 

The twenty points established Native American goals for their relations with the federal government. Twelve of the 20 points directly or indirectly address treaty responsibility in which the U.S. had fallen short.

 Restoration of treaty making (ended by Congress in 1871).
 Establishment of a treaty commission to make new treaties (with sovereign Native Nations).
 Indian leaders to be permitted to address Congress.
 Review of treaty commitments and violations.
 Unratified treaties to go heard by the Senate for action.
 All Indians to be governed by treaty relations.
 Relief for Native Nations for treaty rights violations.
 Recognition of the right of Indians to interpret treaties.
 Joint Congressional Committee to be formed on reconstruction of Indian relations.
 Restoration of terminated rights.
 Repeal of state jurisdiction on Native Nations.
 Federal protection for offenses against Indians.
 Abolition of the Bureau of Indian Affairs.
 Creation of a new office of Federal Indian Relations.
 New office to remedy breakdown in the constitutionally prescribed relationships between the United States and Native Nations.
 Native Nations to be immune to commerce regulation, taxes, trade restrictions of states.
 Indian religious freedom and cultural integrity protected.
 Establishment of national Indian voting with local options; free national Indian organizations from governmental controls
 Reclaim and affirm health, housing, employment, economic development, and education for all Indian people.

According to the Washington Post, during the occupation, Native Americans spent days in the building going through — and taking — files that raised questions about unfair deals on land, water, fishing and mineral rights. Others took artifacts, pottery and artwork that they said belonged to tribes.

Presidential reaction 

As AIM was occupying the BIA building in Washington, D.C., representatives of the Nixon administration were meeting with tribal chairmen in a scheduled meeting at the other end of the country in rural Oregon. A new organization was established, called The National Tribal Chairman’s Association. NTCA was presumably an outgrowth of the National Congress of American Indians, founded in 1944. Nixon promised the support of the federal government for “federally recognized” tribes. This excluded groups that had not been recognized, including tribes whose federal status had been terminated in the 1950s under federal policy of the time, which believed that some tribes were "ready" to assimilate into the mainstream. 

NTCA was given offices within the National Council on Indian Opportunity. Tribal chairmen discussed common issues, including how to manage limited resources. Some believed that “urban Indians,” those members who had left the reservations to live elsewhere, should be excluded from tribal benefits, although such members often struggled economically even in cities. 

When AIM left the Interior building on November 8, the White House had agreed to discuss all 20 points except amnesty, which was to be addressed separately. An “interagency task force” was created, to be co-chaired by representatives of the White House and to include dozens of Indian organizations. The occupiers agreed to leave the building with the assurance that the White House would examine eligibility of Indians for governmental services; adequacy of governmental service delivery; quality, speed, and effectiveness of federal programs; Indian self-government; and congressional implementation of necessary Indian legislation.

Nixon had a different opinion from the 1950s emphasis on termination of tribes and their governments. In line with ideas about decentralization of government, he believed that tribes likely could do better than a distant government agency in managing affairs of their people and serving them. On December 22, 1973 Nixon privately signed the Menominee Restoration Act; it returned Menominee Indians to full federally recognized tribal status, returning their land assets to trust status. He might have played more of a leadership role in these issues but was caught up in the Watergate scandal and resigned the next year on August 9, 1974.

Since this period, other terminated tribes regained their federally recognized status by Congressional legislation. In addition, other tribes have achieved recognition, both through the BIA documentary process, a procedure developed in consultation with representatives of recognized tribes, and sometimes through direct Congressional action.

Depiction in popular culture 

This event is described in the 1990 memoir Lakota Woman by Mary Crow Dog.

References

External links
Jason Heppler, Framing Red Power: Newspapers, the Trail of Broken Treaties, and the Politics of Media, an Internet history project, 2009-2016, University of Nebraska-Lincoln, includes links to extensive primary sources, including media

American Indian Movement
United States Bureau of Indian Affairs
Indigenous rights protests
Protests in Washington, D.C.
1972 in Washington, D.C.
November 1972 events in the United States